Seedskadee National Wildlife Refuge is a National Wildlife Refuge of the United States located in western Sweetwater County in the state of Wyoming. It covers 26,400 acres (106 km2) managed by the U.S. Fish and Wildlife Service, an agency within the U.S. Department of the Interior.

The Shoshone people inhabited the region since the year 1300. The name Seedskadee is derived from the Shoshone language word sisk-a-dee-agie, which means "river of the prairie hen". The area was first visited by white explorers in 1811 and was later a crossroads for the Oregon and Mormon Trails; many of the original wagon tracks left by early pioneers can still be seen.

The refuge includes 36 miles (56 km) of the Green River, which is a water source for shrubs and cottonwoods in an otherwise arid region. The refuge was established in 1965 to mitigate wildlife habitat loss resulting from the construction of Fontenelle Dam upstream and Flaming Gorge Dam downstream on the Green River.

220 species of birds have been identified on the refuge including migratory bird species that use the refuge for nesting. Trumpeter swans, bald eagles, sage grouse, and numerous species of ducks can be found. Dozens of species of mammals including coyote, porcupine, pronghorn, mule deer, bobcat, and moose are indigenous to the region and are protected under law. The Green river hosts Snake River fine-spotted and Bonneville cutthroat trout, and brown and rainbow trout.
Visitors access the refuge by taking Interstate 80 west from Green River, Wyoming, for 6 miles (9.6 km) to Wyoming Highway 372. The entrance is 27 miles (43 km) to the north.

See also
 Cokeville Meadows National Wildlife Refuge, operated as a satellite of Seedskadee NWR

References

External links
 Seedskadee National Wildlife Refuge - U.S. Fish and Wildlife Service.

National Wildlife Refuges in Wyoming
Green River (Colorado River tributary)
Protected areas of Sweetwater County, Wyoming
Protected areas on the Colorado River
Protected areas established in 1965
1965 establishments in Wyoming